Zabrus heydeni is a species of ground beetle in the Pelor subgenus. It was described by Ganglbauer in 1908 and is endemic to Algeria.

References

Beetles described in 1915
Beetles of North Africa
Endemic fauna of Algeria